Chaiyabhumbhakdeechumphon School is a provincial secondary school of Chaiyaphum in north-east Thailand. It was established in 1899 (Rattanakosin Sok 118) during the reign of King Chulalongkorn.

History

Information

Directors

Buildings
* Education Building 1 (Computer & Technology)
 Floor 1–Computer classroom , Thai Bridgestone Robot Center
 Floor 2–C.B. school Library 
 Floor 3–Computer classroom

* Education Building 2 (Foreign language)
 Floor 1–211–216 Foreign language classroom
 Floor 2–221–226 Foreign language classroom
 Floor 3–231–236 Foreign language classroom

* Education Building 4 (Industrial arts)
 Floor 1–Smith classroom
 Floor 2–Drawing & Sketch classroom , Manufacture classroom

* Education Building 5
Floor 1–Marching room , Universal music room , Thaiphan Education Centre , Services room , Student development activities Room
Floor 2–Thai dancing art room , Social studies & History classroom , Arts classroom
Floor 3–Buddhism room , Social studies & History classroom

* Education Building 6 or 99th anniversary Building (Science, Thai language)
Floor 1–99th year anniversary auditorium
Floor 2–Science Laboratory room , Chemical classroom 
Floor 3–Physics classroom , Biology classroom
Floor 4–Science classroom
Floor 5–Thai language classroom
Floor 6–Thai language classroom

* Education Building 7 (Math)
Floor 1 111-year anniversary library
Floor 2 Math classroom , Asean Studies Centre
Floor 3 Math classroom
Floor 4 Math classroom

* Education Building 8
Army reserve force students room
Scout room

* Gyms
Floor 1–Health education classroom , Badminton Stadium , Table tennis Stadium
Floor 2–Athlete room , Teacher Room
Floor 3–Basketball Arena

 Football Stadium
 Cafeteria
 Administration room
 Public relations room

References

Schools in Thailand
Buildings and structures in Chaiyaphum province
Educational institutions established in 1899
1899 establishments in Siam